İncedere can refer to:

 İncedere, Hanak
 İncedere, Kemah
 İncedere, Posof
 İncedere, Şiran